Albert Ajaiso (born 14 November 1986) is a French Guianan footballer who plays as a defender for US Sainte-Marienne.

Career

Ajaiso started his career with French side Lorient C. In 2017, he signed for US Sainte-Marienne in the Réunionese top flight. Before the 2020 season, Ajaiso signed for Réunionese second tier club AS Sainte-Suzanne. Before the 2022 season, he signed for US Sainte-Marienne in Réunion.

References

External links

 

1986 births
Association football defenders
Expatriate footballers in France
Expatriate footballers in Réunion
French Guiana international footballers
French Guianan expatriate footballers
French Guianan footballers
Living people
Régional 1 players
US Montagnarde players
US Sainte-Marienne players